Sychrov may refer to places in the Czech Republic:

Sychrov (Liberec District), a municipality and village in the Liberec Region
Sychrov Castle, a castle in the municipality
Sychrov, a village and part of Borotín (Tábor District) in the South Bohemian Region
Sychrov, a village and part of Hostouň (Domažlice District) in the Plzeň Region
Sychrov, a village and part of Kozlov (Havlíčkův Brod District) in the Vysočina Region
Sychrov, a village and part of Mnichovo Hradiště in the Central Bohemian Region
Sychrov, a village and part of Rosovice in the Central Bohemian Region